Till There Was You is a 2003 Filipino romantic drama film directed by Joyce E. Bernal and starring Judy Ann Santos and Piolo Pascual.

Plot
Joanna (Santos) meets single father Albert (Pascual) and his baby Pippa on a bus. When she gets off the bus, Joanna accidentally leaves her photograph behind with her book. Over the years, Pippa comes to believe that this picture is of her mother's. Years later, Pippa meets Joanna again, and Albert hires her to act as Pippa's mother. Eventually, Albert and Joanna become romantically involved.

Cast
Judy Ann Santos as Joanna Boborol
Piolo Pascual as Albert Robles
Marissa Delgado as Zita Robles
Eliza Pineda as Pippa Robles
Ronaldo Valdez as Alfonso Robles
Angel Jacob as Rachel Garcia
Jennifer Sevilla as Celia Hernandez
Janus Del Prado as Damon Boborol
Bearwin Meily as Bogart Boborol
Matet De Leon as Jean
Gina Pareño as Lagring Boborol
Pen Medina as Frank Boborol

Trivia
Judy Ann Santos and Piolo Pascual were from Sa Puso Ko Iingatan Ka, which ended on February 14.

References

External links

2003 films
2003 romantic drama films
Filipino-language films
Films directed by Joyce Bernal
Philippine romantic drama films
Star Cinema drama films
2000s Tagalog-language films
2000s English-language films